Counterfeit is a 1919 American silent detective drama film directed by George Fitzmaurice and starring Elsie Ferguson. The assistant director was C. Van Arsdale.

The picture was the fourth film Fitzmaurice and Ferguson worked on and is now considered to be a lost film.

Plot
As described in a film magazine, Virginia Griswold (Ferguson), whose family is in financial straits, resolves to remedy the situation by finding the source of widely distributed counterfeit bills, as a large reward is offered for the capture of the maker of the fake bills. A clue takes her to Newport where she poses as one of the idle rich and falls in love with Stuart Kent (Powell), a man of means, who returns her affection. Vincent Cortez (Gerard), about whom little is known, also becomes enamored of Virginia and she accepts his affections, much to the consternation of Stuart. She offers no acceptable explanation to Stuart for this. Carefully and craftily she leads Vincent to the point of sharing confidences, although this course greatly enrages Stuart and for a time threatens to bring open rupture of their relationship. After Vincent admits he is the counterfeiter, however, Virginia brings Stuart to an understanding of the situation and a happy conclusion.

Cast
 Elsie Ferguson as Virginia Griswold
 David Powell as Stuart Kent
 Helen Montrose as Mrs. Palmer
 Charles Kent as Colonel Harrington
 Charles K. Gerard as Vincent Cortez
 Ida Waterman as Mrs. Griswold
 Robert Lee Keeling as Mr. Palmer
 Fred Jenkins as Uncle Ben
 Mrs. Robertson as Aunt Jemima
 Elizabeth Breen as Marinette, the Maid

References

External links

Lobby card(Wayback Machine)
Lantern slide

1919 films
American silent feature films
Films directed by George Fitzmaurice
1919 drama films
American black-and-white films
Lost American films
Films with screenplays by Ouida Bergère
Silent American drama films
1919 lost films
Lost drama films
Counterfeit money in film
1910s American films